Abhilasha was an Indian Telugu language soap opera starring Spandana, Rohit Sahni as main protagonists and Ajay Raj, Sirisha Sougandh in pivotal roles. It aired on Gemini TV from 26 August 2019 to 18 January 2020. The serial was directed by Kumar M and produced by Shashi Sumeet productions. It is the remake of Kannada television series Naanu Nanna kanasu which was aired on Udaya TV.

Plot

The story revolves around Janaki, an academically brilliant student who aspires to fulfill her father's dream by becoming a successful doctor in future. Her father Shankar (Ravi kiran) was a chef in great business man, Vishnu vardhan's (Sai Kiran) house. He lied to her daughter that he was a doctor in order to fulfill his dream. Bhuvaneswari (Ravali), wife of Vishnu Vardhan was jealous of Shankar and his family as her husband helps them. On the other hand, Bhuvaneswari's son has dispute with Janaki at school. She always tries to make her husband separated from Shankar and stop helping them. One day Janaki knows the truth about her father's profession but she decided to become a doctor in order to fulfill her father's dream. Unexpectedly Janaki's life take a drastic turn as fate conspire against and her father died in an accident. No one knows that the accident was a plan of Bhuvaneswari in order save herself from exposure of truth to her husband by about her secret relationship with Manohar. Janaki knows that she has to face many obstacles coming her way to realise her goals. How the girl succeeds in becoming a doctor despite several hurdles forms the crux of the story.
Janu, a humble cook‚ Äôs daughter and Ram, son of a rich businessman share a fond friendship from childhood. As the years roll by, their bond blossoms into love, when Janu, whois all set to achieve her ambition to become a doctor, saves Ram‚ Äôs depleting business from his manipulative stepmother Bhuvana. Follow, how they succeed in life, against Bhuvana‚ Äôs longstanding mysterious hatred.

Cast
Spandana as Janaki (jaanu)
Rohit Sahni as Raghuram, Vishnuvardhan's son
Ajay Raj as Lucky, Vishnuvardhan's younger son
Srinivas Varma as Vishnu vardhan, Raghuram & Lucky's father
Sirisha Sougandh as Bhuvaneswari, Lucky's mother & Raghuram's foster mother
Suchitra as Gowri, Jaanu's mother
Sudheer as Neelakanta, Jaanu's Uncle
Sharif Vikram as Manohar

Former cast
Ravi Kiran as Shankar, Jaanu's father (deceased)
Baby Greeshma as Jaanu at childhood

Sai Kiran as Vishnu vardhan, Raghu, Lucky and Tara's father (Replaced by Srinivas Varma)
Master Venkat showrya as Lucky at childhood
Master Satwik as Raghuram at childhood
Baby sharanya as Tara at childhood

Adaptations

References

Telugu-language television shows
2019 Indian television series debuts
Gemini TV original programming